The 1990–91 IHL season was the 46th season of the International Hockey League, a North American minor professional league. The season started with 11 team, falling to 10 when Albany Choppers folded in February 1991. The Peoria Rivermen won the Turner Cup.

Regular season

Turner Cup-Playoffs

External links
 Season 1990/91 on hockeydb.com

IHL
International Hockey League (1945–2001) seasons